Bernhard Gustav von Baden-Durlach OSB (24 December 1631 at Karlsburg Castle in Durlach – 26 December 1677 in Hammelburg) was a Major General in the Swedish army. After his conversion to Catholicism, he was Abbot of Fulda and Kempten Abbey and also cardinal.

Life 
He was the son of Margrave Frederick V of Baden-Durlach and his second wife Eleonore of Solms-Laubach. He was the godson of King Gustavus Adolphus of Sweden. He was baptized as Gustav Adolph and raised in the Lutheran faith.

As a Major General in the Swedish army, he fought against Poland during the Second Northern War.  After traveling through France and Italy and a lengthy stay in Rome, he converted to Catholicism on 24 August 1660 in the Franciscan Hermolsheim monastery in Mutzig in the Lower Alsace. He took the name of Bernhard Gustav, in honor of the Margrave Bernhard II.

In 1663, the joined the Venetian army and fought in the Turkish War. A year later, he fought in the battle of St. Gotthard. In 1665, he laid down his arms, entered the Benedictine Rheinau Abbey and received minor orders. In 1666, he was appointed coadjutor of the prince-bishop of Fulda. In 1668, he also became coadjutor of Kempten Abbey. In 1671, he became Prince-Bishop in Fulda and coadjutor in the Michaelsberg Abbey in Siegburg.

On 24 August 1671, Pope Clement X made him cardinal of Santa Susanna. In 1676, he participated in the conclave that elected Pope Innocent XI.

He died on 26 December 1677 in Hammelburg and was buried there.

References

External links 
 Entry at catholic-hierarchy.org
 
 Biographies at the Baden State Museum Karlsruhe

German Benedictines
Swedish generals
Benedictine abbots
17th-century German cardinals
Margraves of Baden
1631 births
1677 deaths
Converts to Roman Catholicism from Lutheranism
Military personnel of the Holy Roman Empire
Sons of monarchs